Oksana Olegovna Selekhmeteva (born 13 January 2003) is a Russian tennis player. Selekhmeteva has a career-high singles ranking by the Women's Tennis Association (WTA) of 138, set on 8 August 2022, and a best doubles ranking of 150, achieved on 11 July 2022.

Selekhmeteva won two junior Grand Slam titles in doubles – the 2019 US Open and 2021 French Open. She also reached the final of the 2019 Wimbledon girls' doubles tournament.

Junior career
As a junior, Selekhmeteva posted a 78–44 win–loss record in singles and 83–31 in doubles, and reached as high as world No. 7 in the combined junior rankings in January 2021.

She won two junior Grand Slam doubles titles (each on a different surface) with two different partners – 2019 US Open with Kamilla Bartone and 2021 French Open with Alex Eala. She also finished runner-up at the 2019 Wimbledon Championships, partnering with Bartone.

She competed for the Russian team at the 2018 Summer Youth Olympics, reaching quarterfinals as an unseeded player and being the only player to win a set off eventual gold medalist, Kaja Juvan.

Junior Grand Slam results - Singles:
 Australian Open: 1R (2020)
 French Open: SF (2021)
 Wimbledon: 2R (2019)
 US Open: SF (2019)

Junior Grand Slam results - Doubles:
 Australian Open: –
 French Open: W (2021)
 Wimbledon: F (2019)
 US Open: W (2019)

Professional career

2018–2019: First ITF tournaments, WTA debut
In 2018, Selekhmeteva competed in her first professional tournament at the $15k event in Sant Cugat, qualifying for the main draw defeating two top 800 oppositions despite being unranked. It was her only professional tournament of the year.

She played more ITF tournaments in 2019 while simultaneously competing in the junior events. She made her WTA Tour debut at the St. Petersburg Trophy, but lost to world No. 194, Magdalena Fręch, in a tight three-setter. She then backed it up with her first quarterfinal at the $25k level, defeating third seed Olga Ianchuk to reach the quarterfinals at the RWB Ladies Cup.

The Russian competed in her second WTA tournament at the Kremlin Cup having received another wildcard into the qualifying draw. This time, she lost to good friend Polina Kudermetova, in straight sets.

Selekhmeteva ended the year ranked 781, having accumulated a 10–8 win–loss record at the professional level.

2020: First doubles title
She had to wait until September to reach her first singles quarterfinal of the year at the $25k event in Marbella after the tour was halted due to the COVID-19 pandemic. Her first professional title came at the same tournament, alongside Alina Charaeva. She reached another $25k quarterfinal in Las Palmas, Gran Canaria, this time defeating top 300 players Daniela Seguel and Amandine Hesse.

Selekhmeteva ended the year with a 17–8 win–loss record in singles, and three doubles titles (14–1 win–loss).

2021: First ITF singles title, top 250

Selekhmeteva reached her first professional singles final at the $15k event in Manacor, defeating good friend Alex Eala along the way. She defeated Suzan Lamens in straight sets in the final. In doubles, she enjoyed a 19-match winning streak which started from 2020, picking up two titles in Manacor alongside Ángela Fita Boluda.

After reaching the semifinals of the French Open in the junior tournament and winning the doubles title alongside Eala, she fully concentrated on her professional career and did not play any more junior events. Her first event after was the $60k Open Montpellier, reaching the biggest quarterfinal of her career after losing just 15 games, including qualifying. She lost to second seed Mayar Sherif in straight sets. She entered the $100k Grand Est Open 88, where she qualified for the main draw and earned the biggest win of her career over world No. 98, Martina Trevisan, Roland Garros quarterfinalist a year ago, in the first round. Three consecutive great runs ended with a runner-up result at the $60k Open de Biarritz, winning six consecutive matches in straight sets from qualifying to reach her biggest career final. She lost to top seed Francesca Jones in the final, but won the doubles title alongside Kamilla Bartone. With these results, Selekhmeteva cracked the top 400 for the first time in her career.

Despite having a month's break, Selekhmeteva returned to reach yet another $60k quarterfinal, this time at the ITF Maspalomas where she fell to Sherif once again, though this time she won a set. She also won the biggest doubles title of her career at this tournament with Elina Avanesyan. She continued to achieve good results, making the singles semifinals at the $80k Open de Valencia, earning two top 200 wins in the process despite needing to qualify for the main draw. Her run ended in the hands of the eventual champion Trevisan. Another doubles final followed, this time partnering Ángela Fita Boluda.

She then reached semifinals of the $80k Le Neubourg event, losing to Anna Bondár in straight sets. By virtue of her results, Selekhmeteva received a wildcard into the qualifying draw of the Kremlin Cup where she stunned Arina Rodionova for her first WTA tournament match win. She sealed a spot in her first WTA Tour main draw, after defeating Diana Shnaider in straight sets. In the first round, she faced world No. 32, Veronika Kudermetova, in the biggest match of her career, but fell in an entertaining three-set battle.

2022: Top 200 and major debut
She went through qualifying of the French Open to make her Grand Slam main-draw debut.

Performance timeline

Only main-draw results in WTA Tour, Grand Slam tournaments, Fed Cup/Billie Jean King Cup and Olympic Games are included in win–loss records.

Singles
Current after the 2023 Australian Open.

ITF finals

Singles: 3 (2 titles, 1 runner-up)

Doubles: 14 (8 titles, 6 runner-ups)

Junior Grand Slam finals

Doubles: 3 (2 titles, 1 runner-up)

Notes

References

External links
 
 

2003 births
Living people
Russian female tennis players
US Open (tennis) junior champions
French Open junior champions
Tennis players at the 2018 Summer Youth Olympics
Grand Slam (tennis) champions in girls' doubles